Julaybib was a companion of the Islamic prophet Muhammad and martyr in the early Muslim community.

Name 
His name was acquired prior to his acceptance of Islam and is considered semantically unusual in Arabic; julaybib means "small grown" being the diminutive form of the word jalbab, referring to Julaybib's unusually short stature. Sources also describe him as being damim, suggesting physical unattractiveness or deformity.

Family
Julaybib's lineage was unknown and there is no record of his parents or what tribe he belonged to. All that was known of him was that he was an Arab and that he was one of the Ansar in Medina.

Marriage
The Prophet Muhammad suggested Julaybib as a match for a woman from the Ansar known for her beauty, modesty, and devotion. While the girl's parents—particularly the mother—were at unsatisfied with the proposal at first, the daughter willingly consented and was married to Julaybib. The couple lived together until he was martyred in an expedition soon after. It is said that Julaybib's wife was the most eligible unmarried woman in Medina.

Martyrdom
Soon after his marriage, Julaybib participated in a military expedition with The Prophet Muhammad and was martyred.

A hadith found in Sahih Muslim reports that after the expedition when accounting for missing persons, The Prophet Muhammad ordered a search for Julaybib. He was found lying next to seven enemies he had slain in the battle before being killed. When he was found, The Prophet Muhammad said, "He is from me and I am from him," and then he lifted Julaybib's body himself. Thereafter, he was buried. Some sources in the Islamic tradition report that the sky was filled with thousands of angels who had come to participate in his funeral.

References

See also 
 Salaf
 Sahaba

Sahabah killed in battle